The plumbeous-crowned tyrannulet (Phyllomyias plumbeiceps) is a species of bird in the family Tyrannidae. It is found in the countries of Colombia, Ecuador, and Peru. Its natural habitat is subtropical or tropical moist montanes.

References

plumbeous-crowned tyrannulet
Birds of the Colombian Andes
Birds of the Ecuadorian Andes
Birds of the Peruvian Andes
plumbeous-crowned tyrannulet
Taxonomy articles created by Polbot